Paco Ignacio Taibo I (19 July 1924 in Gijón, Asturias – 13 November 2008 in Mexico City), was a prolific Spanish-Mexican writer and journalist.

Life
His birth name Francisco Ignacio Taibo Lavilla González Nava Suárez Vich Manjón.
He was the director and founder of the cultural section of El Universal.

On November 13, 2008, at age 84, Paco Ignacio Taibo I died in Mexico City from pneumonia.

He is the father of writer Paco Ignacio Taibo II, movie producer Carlos Taibo, and writer and poet Benito Taibo.

Novels 
Juan M. N. (1955)
Fuga, hierro y fuego (1979)
Para parar las aguas del olvido (autobiographical narrative, 1982)
Siempre Dolores (1984)
Pálidas Banderas (1989)
Flor de la tontería (1997)
Tres tuertos en el agua (unpublished)

Plays 
El juglar y la cama (1966)
La quinta parte de un arcángel (1967)
Los cazadores (1967)
Morir del todo (1983)

Essays 
Historia popular del cine
El cine por mis pistolas
El Indio Fernández
María Félix, La Doña 
El libro de todos los moles
La Risa Loca (Enciclopedia del cine cómico)
Breviario de la Fabada

Journalism 
Ocurrencias
Notas de viaje
El hombre sin corbata y otras fabulaciones

References

1924 births
2008 deaths
People from Gijón
Mexican male writers
Spanish emigrants to Mexico
Deaths from pneumonia in Mexico